In botany, a peduncle is a stalk supporting an inflorescence or a solitary flower, or, after fecundation, an infructescence or a solitary fruit. The peduncle sometimes has bracts (a type of cataphylls) at nodes. The main axis of an inflorescence above the peduncle is the rachis. There are no flowers on the peduncle but there are flowers on the rachis.

When a peduncle arises from the ground level, either from a compressed aerial stem or from a subterranean stem (rhizome, tuber, bulb, corm), with few or no bracts except the part near the rachis or receptacle, it is referred to as a scape.

The acorns of the pedunculate oak are borne on a long peduncle, hence the name of the tree.

See also
Pedicel (botany)
Scape (botany)

References

Plant anatomy
Plant morphology
+

scn:Pidicuddu